Renée Garilhe (15 June 1923 – 6 July 1991) was a French fencer. She won a bronze medal in the women's individual foil event at the 1956 Summer Olympics, and a gold medal in both women's individual foil and foil team events at the 1950 World Fencing Championships.

References

External links
 

1923 births
1991 deaths
French female foil fencers
Olympic fencers of France
Fencers at the 1948 Summer Olympics
Fencers at the 1952 Summer Olympics
Fencers at the 1956 Summer Olympics
Fencers at the 1960 Summer Olympics
Olympic bronze medalists for France
Olympic medalists in fencing
Fencers from Paris
Medalists at the 1956 Summer Olympics
20th-century French women